State Route 9 (SR 9) is a  long state highway traversing three counties, Snohomish, Skagit, and Whatcom, in the U.S. state of Washington. Three other roadways are briefly concurrent with the route:  in Arlington,  in Sedro-Woolley, and  near Deming. A spur route in Sumas serves trucks traveling into British Columbia.

Before SR 9 was created, several other roads used the route of the current highway. The first was a roadway extending from the current southern terminus to Snohomish established by 1895 and another road between Arlington and Sedro-Woolley by 1911. These roads were combined and several other roads were added to create Secondary State Highway 1A (SSH 1A), which originally ran from Woodinville to Blaine in 1937. A branch of SSH 1A connected the mainline to the Canada–US border in Sumas, but was later included into SSH 1A when the Blaine to Sumas segment was deleted in 1953. A highway renumbering in 1964 introduced the sign routes that would be co-signed with the existing system until 1970, one of which would replace SSH 1A, SR 9. SR 9 was not complete between Lake Stevens and Arlington until after 1966.

Between 2004 and 2009, nine complete construction projects, arranged by the Washington State Department of Transportation (WSDOT), have improved the roadway. The projects ranged from expanding the current weigh station at the Soper Hill Road intersection in 2005 to realigning the highway between Nooksack and Sumas in 2006 to eliminate 90-degree turns. WSDOT is also widening SR 9 in Snohomish County from 2 lanes to a four-lane divided highway. Between 2009 and 2013, WSDOT plans to complete six other projects in Snohomish County to improve the corridor from SR 522 to Bryant.

Route description

The roadway continues south as Woodinville–Snohomish Road, while SR 522 connects the area to Seattle, Bothell, and Monroe. SR 9 travels north along the west side of the Brightwater sewage treatment plant and a community park in Maltby. The four-lane highway continues north and intersects SR 524 at Turners Corner before turning northeast towards Clearview and Cathcart. SR 9 travels along the eastern ridge that overlooks the Snohomish River valley and has several sections with median barriers to form a divided highway.

Shortly after passing Cathcart,  terminates at the road. SR 9 passes Harvey Airfield and crosses another BNSF rail line and the Snohomish River to enter Snohomish. Curving north out of Snohomish, the route interchanges with US 2 in a modified diamond interchange, with a westbound US 2 offramp routed onto New Bunk Foss Road.

In suburban West Lake Stevens near the Lake Stevens shoreline,  ends at the highway. After the intersection, the roadway had an estimated daily average of 25,000 motorists in 2007, making this stretch of road the busiest on the whole highway. SR 9 also forms the western boundary of Lake Stevens and the eastern boundary of Marysville while passing a weigh station and the  junction. After Lake Cassidy, the road intersects  and continues into North Marysville, where the roadway passes over the Snohomish County Centennial Trail. After intersecting  at a roundabout, and several residential subdivisions near the Arlington High School, the highway enters downtown Arlington as Hazel Street.

Entering Skagit County, the highway continues northwest through a large forest to Lake McMurray, where it intersects  and encounters the Lake McMurray Store, established in 1889. The road passes through Big Lake and its community of the same name before intersecting  at a roundabout east of Mount Vernon. Turning northeast to Clear Lake, the route crosses the Skagit River into Sedro-Woolley. At the end of the concurrency, the road turns north as Township Street, paralleling another BNSF rail line, at Cascade Middle School. Continuing north out of the city and into rural areas, SR 9 crosses the Samish River and exits Skagit County.

The highway enters Whatcom County in a valley located east of Lake Whatcom. Traveling west with SR 542 along the Nooksack River, the road splits at another roundabout in Cedarville and continues north through a series of 90-degree turns in a plain located near the Sumas River. In Nooksack, the route becomes Nooksack Avenue and encounters , named Main Street, which travels west to Everson. North of Nooksack, SR 9 intersects  in a rural area and travels northeast along the Sumas River to Sumas. In Sumas,  ends at SR 9 and a spur route that serves trucks branches off and SR 9 terminates at the Canada–US border.

Spur route

Within Sumas, SR 9 has a short  spur route that is used by trucks travelling into Canada. SR 9 Spur starts at SR 9 (Cherry Street) and travels east as Garfield Street and north as Sumas Avenue to the Canada–US border, where it becomes Boundary Avenue and reconnects back to SR 9's continuation in Canada, Highway 11 (BC 11) in Abbotsford, BC. After the Cherry Street intersection, an estimated daily average of 1,800 motorists used the roadway in 2007.

History

The current route of SR 9 began as a road extending from Grace (today Woodinville) north to Snohomish, first appearing in an 1895 map. The Snohomish to Arlington segment was not built until after SR 9, but between Arlington and Sedro-Woolley, there was a highway by 1911. The first section of the roadway to be included in the state highway system was the current  concurrency, which became a branch of  extending from Bellingham to Mount Baker in 1925. A branch of SSH 1A connected the main highway to the Canada–US border. Much of the highway was not complete at the time, leading to calls from the Associated Clubs of the North End to accelerate construction to provide an alternate connection to Canada.

Between Lynden and Nooksack, SSH 1A was realigned in 1951 and in 1953, SSH 1A between Blaine and Sumas was deleted. The corridor was also incorporated into the East Pacific Highway, a designation created in 1951 as an alternative route to US 99 between Tenino and the Canadian border at Sumas. Plans to build a full limited-access highway on the corridor as originally proposed were later dropped by the state government. A  section between Snohomish and Lake Stevens was moved to a new, straightened roadway that opened on September 12, 1952. The Lake Stevens–Arlington section of SSH 1A was opened in late 1959, bypassing Jordan Road and the Granite Falls area.  became concurrent with SSH 1A in 1957 when it was extended east through Arlington to Darrington. A third concurrency was added in 1961 when  was extended west, concurrent in Sedro-Woolley, to Fredonia.

During the 1964 highway renumbering, a new system of highways, sign routes, was introduced and was co-signed with the existing primary and secondary state highways. SSH 1A became SR 9, but SSH 1A was still signed until 1970. A plan to truncate SSH 1A to Maltby and build a new highway from Snohomish was proposed in the 1950s but later abandoned. In 1970, SR 202 became .

Since 2004, the Washington State Department of Transportation (WSDOT) has completed nine construction projects on SR 9. The Lake Stevens weigh station, located on the west side of the highway at the Sopher Hill Road intersection was expanded to serve two trucks at once in late 2005. The  (US 2) interchange was modified to use New Bunk Foss Road as an onramp and traffic signals were added in January 2006. The roadway was repaved between Snohomish and Lake Stevens and also guardrails and turn lanes were added in 2006.< On November 22, 2006, WSDOT opened a new alignment of SR 9 between Nooksack to Sumas that bypassed three 90-degree turns. A roundabout was added to the  intersection east of Mount Vernon in summer 2007. A curve on the roadway north of Arlington was straightened in late 2008 and turn lanes were added to two intersections near Bryant.

Future developments

Between 1980 and 2000, the population of Snohomish County grew by 80 percent, resulting in increased congestion on the two-lane SR 9. Accidents have increased from an average of 325 collisions per year in the 1990s to 450 collisions per year between 2000 and 2007. South of Snohomish, WSDOT is improving the highway in multiple ways including new intersections and alignments, new web cameras and new turn lanes. Between  and Clearview, the 2-lane road is being widened to a four-lane divided highway starting in 2011. The  intersection south of Arlington was scheduled to be rebuilt as a roundabout in 2011. The roundabout option was chosen over a traffic signal in early October 2009. A route development plan is currently being designed for the highway between SR 522 and Schloman Road north of Arlington. During a project to widen SR 9 in Lake Stevens, a left-turn lane to Lake Stevens Road was removed in 2009 and residents located on the road have protested. The intersection of SR 9 and SR 204 in Lake Stevens is planned to be replaced with a series of roundabouts to be complete by 2023.

WSDOT plans to widen SR 9 near downtown Snohomish to four lanes by building a second bridge over the Snohomish River to carry southbound traffic. The $142 million project is projected to be completed in 2025.

Major intersections

Spur intersections

References

External links

Highways of Washington State

009
Transportation in Snohomish County, Washington
Transportation in Skagit County, Washington
Transportation in Whatcom County, Washington